Events from the year 2002 in Romania.

Incumbents 

President: Ion Iliescu 
Prime Minister: Adrian Năstase

Events

March 
 15 March – Romanian film Filantropica is released.

November 
 23 November – United States President Bush gives a speech in Revolution Square, Bucharest.

December 
 18 December – The government starts the procedure of repatriating the remains of Carol II.

Full date unknown 
 Eurocopter Romania is established.
 The Peștera cu Oase ("Cave with Bones") located near the city of Anina, is uncovered containing 34,950-year-old human remains.
 Philippe Étienne is appointed French ambassador to Romania.

Deaths

January

 13 January - Ferdinand Weiss, 69, Romanian pianist.

February

 20 February - Cristian Neamtu, Romanian player

April

 12 April - Gabriel Raksi, 63, Romanian football player.

May

 22 May - Alexandru Todea, 89, Romanian Greek-Catholic bishop and cardinal.

July

 25 July - Alexander Ratiu, 86, Romanian-American priest of the Greek-Catholic Church.

September

 2 September - Rodica Ojog-Brașoveanu, 63, Romanian writer, severe lung problems.

October

 1 October - Ilie Ceaușescu, Romanian general and communist politician

See also
 
2002 in Europe
Romania in the Eurovision Song Contest 2002
Romania at the 2002 Winter Olympics

References

External links 

 

2000s in Romania
 
Romania
Romania
Years of the 21st century in Romania